Félix Bruzzone (born 1976 in Buenos Aires) is an Argentinian writer.

Life and work
Bruzzone studied literature at the University of Buenos Aires. He was named one of the ten most important authors of the decade by Clarín, the largest newspaper in Argentina. His books deal with the Argentine military dictatorship of the 1970s and 1980s and the victims of this era. Bruzzone's parents were among those, the so-called "disappeared", his father having been arrested three months before his birth, and his mother abducted a few months later. Their further fate remains unresolved. Bruzzone grew up in the care of his grandmother.

Selected works

Novels
 Los Topos (Buenos Aires: Mondadori/Random House, 2008).
 Barrefondo (Buenos Aires: Mondadori/Random House, 2010).
 Las Chanchas (Buenos Aires: Mondadori/Random House, 2014).

Short stories
 76 (Buenos Aires: Tamarisco, 2007; Buenos Aires: Momofuku, 2013).

Non-fiction
 Piletas (Buenos Aires: Excursiones, 2017). Illustrated by Juan Astica.

Children's literature
 Julian en el Espejo (Madrid: Pípala/Adriana Hidalgo, 2015). Illustrated by Pablo Derka. 
 Julian y el Caballo de Piedra (Madrid: Pipala/Adriana Hidalgo, 2016). Illustrated by Germán Wendel.

Works in translation
 Unimog. In: Timo Berger und Rike Bolte (Hrsg.): Asado Verbal. Junge argentinische Literatur. Verlag Klaus Wagenbach, Berlin 2010.
 76. Berenberg Verlag, Berlin 2010.

Awards
 2010 Anna Seghers-Preis, awarded with Andreas Schäfer

External links
 
 Short biographical portrait on the website of the Botenstoffe Argentinian-German writers conference (in Spanish and English)
 "Auf der Suche nach der Geschichte" ("In search of the history"), profile on Deutschlandradio 7 February 2011 (German)

Living people
1976 births
Argentine male writers